Wandin was a railway station on the Warburton line in Melbourne, Australia.  The station operated until the line closed in 1965.  All that remains of this station is a well-preserved retaining wall for the station platform.

The station served the village of Wandin.

External links
Walker diesel rail car and Y-class diesel locomotive no. 116, at Wandin Station. circa 1960.

Disused railway stations in Melbourne
Railway stations in Australia opened in 1901
Railway stations closed in 1965
1965 disestablishments in Australia